Karel Smyczek (born 31 March 1950) (IPA: /karɛl smɪtzɛk/) is a Czech film director, actor and screenwriter. His film Why? was screened in the Un Certain Regard section at the 1988 Cannes Film Festival.

Selected filmography

References

External links

1950 births
Living people
Czech film directors
Czech male film actors
Czech screenwriters
Male screenwriters
People from Slaný